Madh Island (Marathi pronunciation: [məɖʱ]) is a group of several quaint fishing villages and farmlands in northern Mumbai.

Geography
The area is bounded by the Arabian Sea to the west, and the Malad creek on the east. There are few beaches like Erangal Beach, Dana Pani Beach, Silver Beach, Aksa Beach.

Accessibility
The area is accessible by bus service (#271 to Malad and #269 to Borivali) or an autorickshaw from Malad. There is also a ferry service from Versova. One can reach Madh Island by a ferry service or speed boat from Versova Jetty and cross over in five minutes.

Demographics
The area is a rural area inhabited primarily by Kolis, Marathi, East Indians, Roman Catholics in Madh village as well as by people from other communities.

Madh Fort 
Madh Fort is a small fort in northern Mumbai, India situated at Madh Island. It was built by the Portuguese in Portuguese occupied India. They lost it during the war against Maratha empire when the Maratha Empire captured it in February 1739.

The British occupied Salsette Island, Thana Fort, Fort Versova, and the island fort of Karanja in 1774.

It is situated south of Madh Village. It is around a 2 km walk from Madh Mandir bus stop. The fort was built by the Portuguese, as a watchtower in the 17th century. It offers a strategic view of the coastline and guards the Marve Creek. Its external façade is intact but internally it is dilapidated. It is under control of the Indian Air Force as it is located close to an Indian Air Force base and permission is needed for accessing it. Madh Fort is not open to the public, and it is surrounded by local fishermen communities.

In popular culture 
Some Bollywood films like Deewana, Love Ke Liye Kuchh Bhi Karega, Baazigar, Shootout at Wadala, and Manmohan Desai's 1985 film Mard, Zamana Deewana, Khalnayak, Shatranj and Tarazu, Game Paisa Ladki were shot at this location. Many episodes of the popular serials Naamkarann, Chandrakanta, C.I.D., Aahat and SuperCops vs Supervillains. The location also saw the shooting of London-based Ocxee Company's ad film in July 2022 starring Suniel Shetty, directed by international award-winner Suman Ganguli and production by Modern moviee. 
The location is often referenced by standup comedian Kapil Sharma in his popular comedy show, The Kapil Sharma Show, in his jokes on presenter and permanent guest Archana Puran Singh, who lives in the area.

Gallery

See also

List of forts in Maharashtra

References

Portuguese forts in India
Portuguese structures in Mumbai
1739 in India
1730s in Portuguese India
Neighbourhoods in Mumbai
Villages in Mumbai Suburban district
Islands of Mumbai
Islands of India
Populated places in India